The short-billed honeycreeper (Cyanerpes nitidus) is a species of bird in the family Thraupidae.
It is found in Bolivia, Brazil, Colombia, Ecuador, Peru, Suriname, and Venezuela.
Its natural habitat is subtropical or tropical moist lowland forests.

References

short-billed honeycreeper
Birds of the Amazon Basin
short-billed honeycreeper
Taxonomy articles created by Polbot